The 2012 United States House of Representatives elections in Alabama were held on Tuesday, November 6, 2012, to elect the seven U.S. representatives from the state, one from each of the state's seven congressional districts. The elections coincided with the elections of other federal and state offices, including a quadrennial presidential election. Primary elections were held on March 13, 2012; runoff elections were held on April 24.

Redistricting
A redistricting bill was passed by the Alabama House of Representatives and Senate on June 2, 2011, and signed into law by Governor Robert Bentley on June 8. To comply with the 1965 Voting Rights Act, the map received approval from the U.S. Department of Justice or a federal court before it could be enacted; the Department of Justice approved the map on November 21, 2011.

Overview
The table below shows the total number and percentage of votes, as well as the number of seats gained and lost by each political party in the election for the United States House of Representatives in Alabama.

District 1

The redrawn 1st district remains based in Mobile and continues to include the entirety of the state's coast.  Republican Jo Bonner, who has represented the 1st district since 2003, sought re-election.

Republican primary

Candidates

Nominee
Jo Bonner, incumbent U.S. Representative

Eliminated in primary
Peter Gounares, real estate broker and candidate for this seat in 2010 
Pete Riehm, real estate agent
Dean Young, businessman and conservative activist

Primary results

Democratic primary
No Democrats qualified to seek the nomination. 

Clint Moser, who had planned to run against Bonner as an independent, did not do so. Bonner easily won re-election on November 6, 2012.

General election

Results

District 2

The redrawn 2nd district is based in the suburbs of Montgomery and covers the southeast of the state. Republican Martha Roby, who has represented the 2nd district since January 2011, sought re-election in 2012.

Republican primary

Candidates

Nominee
Martha Roby, incumbent U.S. Representative

Democratic primary

Candidates

Nominee
Therese Ford

Declined
Bobby Bright, former U.S. Representative

General election

Results

District 3

The redrawn 3rd district is more favorable to Republicans than its previous incarnation. Republican Mike Rogers, who has represented the 3rd district since 2003, sought re-election.

Republican primary

Candidates

Nominee
Mike Rogers, incumbent U.S. Representative

Democratic primary

Candidates

Nominee
John Andrew Harris, child nutrition program worker for Auburn City Schools

General election

Results

District 4

The northern part of Tuscaloosa County was added to the 4th district during redistricting, while most of Blount County was removed. Republican Robert Aderholt, who has represented the 4th district since 1997, sought re-election.

Republican primary

Candidates

Nominee
Robert Aderholt, incumbent U.S. Representative

Democratic primary

Candidates

Nominee
Daniel Boman, state representative

Eliminated in primary
Rick Neighbors, former plant supervisor

Primary results

General election

Results

District 5

Lawrence and Colbert counties were moved from the 4th district to the 5th district during redistricting. Republican Mo Brooks, who represented the 5th district since January 2011, sought re-election.

Republican primary

Candidates

Nominee
Mo Brooks, incumbent U.S. Representative

Eliminated in primary
Parker Griffith, former U.S. Representative

Primary results

Democratic primary

Candidates

Nominee
Charlie Holley, Baptist minister

General election

Results

District 6

The redrawn 6th district is centered around the suburbs of Birmingham. Republican Spencer Bachus, who has represented Alabama's 6th congressional district since 1993, sought re-election.

Republican primary

Candidates

Nominee
Spencer Bachus, incumbent U.S. Representative

Eliminated in primary
Scott Beason, state senator 
Al Mickle, businessman and Tea Party activist
David Standridge, Blount County Probate Judge

Withdrawn
Justin Barkley
Stan Pate, businessman

Primary results

Democratic primary

Candidates

Nominee
Penny Bailey, retired Air Force Colonel

Eliminated in primary
William Barnes, attorney and nominee for the Senate in 2010

Primary results

General election

Results

District 7

The redrawn 7th district, located on the state's western border, is 64% African American and was made even more favorable to Democrats in the 2010 redistricting. Incumbent Terri Sewell, who has represented the 7th district since January 2011, sought re-election.

Democratic primary

Candidates

Nominee
Terri Sewell, incumbent U.S. Representative

Republican primary

Candidates

Nominee
Don Chamberlain

Eliminated in primary
Phil Norris, retired United States Navy submariner

Primary results

General election

Results

Sewell won the general election on November 6, 2012 remaining the only Democrat in Alabama's Congressional delegation. This was the last time Republicans contested Alabama's 7th congressional district until 2022.

References

External links
Elections from the Alabama Secretary of State
Alabama Votes, government election center
United States House of Representatives elections in Alabama, 2012 at Ballotpedia
Alabama U.S. House at OurCampaigns.com
Campaign contributions for U.S. Congressional races in Alabama at OpenSecrets
Outside spending at the Sunlight Foundation
Election news coverage from AL.com

2012
Alabama

United States House of Representatives